In enzymology, a raucaffricine beta-glucosidase is an enzyme that catalyzes the chemical reaction

raucaffricine + H2O  D-glucose + vomilenine

Thus, the two substrates of this enzyme are raucaffricine and H2O, whereas its two products are D-glucose and vomilenine.

This enzyme belongs to the family of hydrolases, specifically those glycosidases that hydrolyse O- and S-glycosyl compounds.  The systematic name of this enzyme class is raucaffricine beta-D-glucohydrolase. Other names in common use include raucaffricine beta-D-glucosidase, and raucaffricine glucosidase.  This enzyme participates in indole and ipecac alkaloid biosynthesis.

References

 

EC 3.2.1
Enzymes of unknown structure